The Criminal Justice and Court Services Act 2000 is a United Kingdom Act of Parliament that advances a number of agendas related to criminal justice. It instituted the National Probation Service as well as the Children and Family Court Advisory and Support Service. The Act also makes the parents of persistent truants criminally liable and subject to a maximum penalty of three months in prison, a legal change that led to the first imprisonment of parents in 2002.

On sentencing, the Act formally removes the role of the Home Secretary in sentencing of young people for grave crimes (such as murder) following the decisions by the House of Lords in R v Secretary of State for the Home Dept ex parte Venables and Thompson (1997) and the subsequent case at the European Court of Human Rights, T. v United Kingdom. The European Court of Human Rights had found that the right to a fair trial guaranteed by the Convention had been infringed in the cases of Robert Thompson and Jon Venables (the murderers of James Bulger) by having sentences determined by the serving Home Secretary, a political appointee. §60 of the Act assigns the power to sentence those people under 18 who are tried as adults for serious crimes with the trial judge rather than the Home Secretary.

The Act introduced a number of drugs-related provisions including drug abstinence orders, a community-based sentence that allows a court to order an offender to abstain from specified class A drugs. It also allows for pre-sentence drug testing of convicted offenders, as well as drug testing of people held in police custody.

References

External links 
 Full text on legislation.gov.uk

United Kingdom Acts of Parliament 2000